William Gage may refer to:

People 
William Gage (15th-century landowner) (1447–1497)

Sir William Gage, 7th Baronet (1695–1744), MP for Seaford from 1727 until his death

William Gage, 2nd Viscount Gage (1718–1791), equerry to the Prince of Wales and Member of Parliament
William Hall Gage (1777–1864), Second Sea Lord and Admiral of the Fleet in the British Navy
William James Gage (1849–1921), Canadian publisher and philanthropist
William J. Gage (fl. 1921–30), American architect, designed Beverly Hills City Hall
Sir William Gage (judge) (born 1938), UK Lord Justice of Appeal

Other 
Sir William Gage Middle School, in Brampton, Ontario, Canada